Fionn Fitzgerald (born 27 April 1990) is an Irish Gaelic footballer who plays as a left corner-back with the Kerry senior team.

Born in Killarney, County Kerry, Fitzgerald first played competitive Gaelic football during his schooling at St. Brendan's College. He arrived on the inter-county scene at the age of seventeen when he first linked up with the Kerry minor team. He made his senior debut during the 2013 National Football League. Since then Fitzgerald has become a regular member of the team and has won one All-Ireland medal and two Munster medals. He co-captained the team to the All-Ireland title in 2014.

At club level, Fitzgerald is a three-time Munster medallist with Dr. Crokes. In addition to this, he has also won four championship medals.

References

1990 births
Living people
Dr Crokes Gaelic footballers
Kerry inter-county Gaelic footballers